Niger is a country in Western Africa.

Niger may also refer to: Oladplade which is a uncommon nigerian species

Places
 Niger River, a river in West Africa
 Niger State, the largest state in Nigeria
 Niger River (Tomifobia River tributary), a river in Estrie, Quebec, Canada
 Niger Vallis, a valley on Mars that appears to have been carved by water
 8766 Niger, an asteroid

People

Given name
 Niger Innis (born 1968), American political consultant and strategist

Surname
 Simeon Niger, a person in the Book of Acts in the New Testament
 Pescennius Niger ( – 194), Roman usurper
 Sextius Niger, Roman writer on pharmacology during the reign of Augustus
 Ermoldus Nigellus or Niger (fl. 824–830), a poet at the court of Pippin of Aquitaine
 Dub, King of Scotland (died 967), called Niger
 Ralph Niger ( – ), Anglo-French theologian and Archdeacon of Gloucester
 Roger Niger (died 1241), Bishop of London
 Peter Georg Niger (1434–1481/1484), Dominican theologian, preacher and controversialist
 Shmuel Niger (1883-1955), a Yiddish writer

Other uses
 HMS Niger, several British warships
 Niger-class frigate, a class of Royal Navy frigate built in the mid 18th century
 Guizotia abyssinica, a cultivated plant with the common name ''

See also
 
 Black#Etymology
 Nigga
 Nigeria (disambiguation)
 Nigar (disambiguation)
 Nigra (disambiguation)
 Nigger (disambiguation)